Roy Mitchell-Cárdenas (born July 25, 1977 in Houston, Texas) is an American musician, writer, and multi-instrumentalist. He was the bassist (and sometimes guitarist) for the rock band Mutemath, as well as the bassist for Earthsuit. Mitchell-Cárdenas has been playing in bands since he was twelve years old and has worked as a session musician and producer for many groups.

In addition to bass guitar, he plays upright bass, guitar, drums and keyboards.

Discography

Solo 
 Jive Demo (1992) – electric guitar

With Earthsuit 
 Noise for Your Eyes (1999) – electric and acoustic bass
 Kaleidoscope Superior (2000) – electric bass, sample/programming

With Mutemath 
 Mutemath (2006) – electric and acoustic bass
 Armistice (2009) – electric and acoustic bass, guitar on "Spotlight"
 Odd Soul (2011) – electric bass, electric guitar, acoustic guitar, and percussion
 Vitals (2015) - electric guitar, electric bass, and synthesizers.
 Play Dead (2017) – electric bass and electric guitar

Other 
 Roadside Prophets – Kafecito Sessions (1995) – acoustic guitar and vocals
 Katie Wilson – Demo (2007) – electric and acoustic bass
 Gentlemen at Arms – EP (2007)
 Slow Hands – Dependence (2008) – bass on "Cocoon"
 Mari Iijima – Take a Picture Against the Light (2012) – bass on "Impossible People"
 Pescao Vivo – Mi Fortuna (2012) – electric & acoustic guitar, bass, vocals, programming
 Empire Theory – Colors EP (2012) – electric & acoustic guitar, bass, programming
 Plastic Planets – Plastic Planets (2013) - electric & acoustic guitar, vocals
 Manic After Midnite – Faces (Can You Tell Me) Single (2014) – bass
 The Pink Dust - The Pink Dust (2014) - electric guitar, bass, keyboards, programming

Production 
Meshach Jackson – Experiments(in)Drowning(ep)
Pescao Vivo – Mi Fortuna
Empire Theory – Colors EP
Mirza Zaza – Atlas EP
The Pink Dust – The Pink Dust

References

External links
Official Website

1977 births
Living people
Musicians from Houston
American musicians of Mexican descent
American double-bassists
Male double-bassists
American multi-instrumentalists
Guitarists from Texas
21st-century double-bassists
21st-century American bass guitarists
21st-century American male musicians
Hispanic and Latino American musicians